Crescent Theatre is located in Sussex, Sussex County, New Jersey, United States. The theatre was built in 1917 and was added to the National Register of Historic Places on September 7, 2005.

See also
National Register of Historic Places listings in Sussex County, New Jersey

References

Buildings and structures in Sussex County, New Jersey
National Register of Historic Places in Sussex County, New Jersey
Theatres on the National Register of Historic Places in New Jersey
Theatres completed in 1917
Sussex, New Jersey
New Jersey Register of Historic Places